The Shwegugyi Temple (literally, "Great Golden Cave") is a Theravadin Buddhist temple in Bagan, Myanmar. The temple is recognized as Monument #1589 in the Bagan Archeological Area, a UNESCO World Heritage Site.

Located just to the southeast of what apparently were the ruins of the former royal palace founded by King Kyansittha (r. 1084–1113), the temple was built by King Sithu I of Pagan (Bagan) in 1131. According to the stone inscriptions at the temple, set up in 1141, construction work on the temple began on 17 May 1331, and was completed on 17 December 1331.

Gallery

References

Bibliography
 
 
 
 
 

Buddhist temples in Myanmar
12th-century Buddhist temples
Bagan
Religious buildings and structures completed in 1131